Ekei Bole Shooting is a non-fiction Bengali book by the acclaimed film director Satyajit Ray. The book is a collection of Ray's writing on his experiences during the shooting of cinemas. The writings were initially published in the children's periodical Sandesh in 1979. Ray illustrates various difficulties and amusing moments of his director life in this book.

References 

Books about film
Books by Satyajit Ray
Works originally published in Sandesh (magazine)